Giovanni De Andrea (22 April 1928 – 19 January 2012) was an Italian Roman Catholic titular archbishop and diplomat.

Education 
Ordained to the priesthood on June 29, 1951. From 1956 to 1958 he studied at the Pontifical Ecclesiastical Academy, then he entered the diplomatic service of the Holy See.

Career 
De Andrea was named titular archbishop of Aquaviva on April 14, 1975. He served as apostolic delegate to Angola and Libya and apostolic pro-nuncio to Iran, Algeria, and Tunisia.

In 1989, he was appointed vice-president of the Labour Office of the Apostolic See retiring in 2007.

Between 1993 and 2003, he served as President of the Vatican Publishing House.

For many years he was a Grand Prior of the Lieutenancy for Central Italy and Sardinia of the Order of the Holy Sepulchre.

Family 
His younger brother Giuseppe de Andrea was also a priest. On September 20, 2001, he conferred the Episcopal Consecration to him as an Archbishop of the Titular See of Anzio.

Death 
He died in Rome at the age of 83. Cardinal Angelo Sodano presided at his funeral rites at the altar of the Cathedra in St. Peter's Basilica.

References

1928 births
2012 deaths
21st-century Italian Roman Catholic titular archbishops
Italian diplomats
People from Rivarolo Canavese
20th-century Italian Roman Catholic titular archbishops
Pontifical Ecclesiastical Academy alumni
Apostolic Nuncios to Libya
Apostolic Nuncios to Angola
Apostolic Nuncios to Iran
Apostolic Nuncios to Tunisia
Apostolic Nuncios to Algeria